Charles Vernon Pittman (born January 22, 1948 in Baltimore, Maryland) is a former professional American football player. He was an All-American halfback at Penn State and played in the NFL for the St. Louis Cardinals and the Baltimore Colts.

Collegiate career
Recruited out of Edmondson High School in Baltimore, Maryland, Pittman was a member of Joe Paterno's first recruiting class as head coach. A crafty, oversized running back on defensive-minded teams, he rushed for 2,236 yards and 30 touchdowns in his career with the Nittany Lions. In his junior and senior seasons, Penn State went 22-0, with wins over Kansas and Missouri in the 1969 and 1970 Orange Bowls.

Pittman led the Nittany Lions in rushing in 1969 with 706 yards and 10 touchdowns on 149 carries, caught 10 passes for 127 yards and topped the team in scoring with 66 points. He was named All-American following the 1969 season and was selected by the St. Louis Cardinals in the third round of the 1970 NFL Draft (#58 overall).

Father/son connections
Conversely, Pittman's son Tony Pittman starred as an undersized defensive back on the high-powered offense of the 1994 Penn State Nittany Lions football team.

Father and son were both starters for the Nittany Lions. Despite playing on three of Joe Paterno's five undefeated teams, both were denied national championships that could have been awarded their teams, but were given to other squads.

Charlie Pittman never lost a game he started in high school and neither he nor Tony ever lost a game they started at Penn State. Their combined college records are 45-0-1. In the sports world, that is almost a miraculous number. In elite college football, there is no father-son tandem better at their game, record-wise, than the Pittmans.  Both father Chalie and son Tony Pittman were also academic all-Americans while attending and playing football for Penn State.

New York Giants general manager Ernie Accorsi, who spent decades guiding NFL teams notes, "it's unprecedented; it's hard to believe," Accorsi said. "That record for a father and son at the same university—and the son played in the Big Ten—that is something mind-boggling."

Personal
Pittman is currently the senior vice president of publishing at Schurz Communications, a South Bend, Indiana-based media company. In 2007, he teamed up with his son Tony to write Playing for Paterno, about their shared experiences as the first father/son to play for the legendary coach.

Trivia
Pittman wore jersey number 24 at Penn State—the same number worn by his boyhood idol, and fellow Nittany Lion, Lenny Moore. His son Tony would wear the same number during his days at Penn State (1992–1994) to honor his father. (Lenny Moore wore 24 as a Baltimore Colt but wore 42 during his playing days at Penn State)

External links
"Pittman, son release book", Daily American, August 25, 2007
"Lions' Pittman hopes to duplicate father's success", The Daily Collegian, September 19, 1994
"Pittman persevered through pressures", South Bend Tribune, September 6. 2007
A player's tribute to Joe Paterno's legacy, South Bend Tribune, July 18. 2008
 

1948 births
Living people
American football defensive backs
American football running backs
American memoirists
American publishers (people)
Baltimore Colts players
Penn State Nittany Lions football players
St. Louis Cardinals (football) players
Players of American football from Baltimore